Lepadichthys lineatus, also known as the twoline clingfish, doubleline clingfish or doublestripe feather star clingfish, is a small clingfish (up to 45 mm in length) which lives among the arms of crinoids. This species has an Indo-Pacific distribution from the Red Sea to Fiji, however, this is scattered rather than continuous and it has been recorded off Mozambique, the Seychelles, Sri Lanka, Myanmar, Philippines, Papaua New Guinea, the Marianas, Japan and Fiji.

References

External links
 

lineatus
Taxa named by John Carmon Briggs
Fish described in 1966